William Lamar Lothridge (January 1, 1942 – February 23, 1996) was an American football Punter, Safety and Quarterback in the National Football League for the Dallas Cowboys, Los Angeles Rams, Atlanta Falcons and Miami Dolphins. He played college football at Georgia Tech.

Early years
Lothridge was a graduate of Gainesville High School in Gainesville, Georgia where he played quarterback. He teamed with Billy Martin both at Gainesville and later in Georgia Tech to form a dominant passing/rushing attack. As a senior, he received All-State and All-Southern honors.

He accepted a football scholarship from Georgia Tech and became a starter as a junior, registering 1,006 passing yards, 6 passing touchdowns, 8 interceptions, 478 rushing yards and 9 rushing touchdowns.

As a senior in 1963, he posted  1,017 passing yards, 10 passing touchdowns, 7 interceptions, 223 rushing yards and 3 rushing touchdowns. He ranked fourth in nation in scoring, tenth in punting (40.8 average) and finished second in the Heisman Trophy voting behind Roger Staubach.

In 1969, he was inducted into the Georgia Tech Sports Hall of Fame. In 1986, he was inducted into the Georgia Sports Hall of Fame.

Professional career

Dallas Cowboys
Lothridge was selected by the Dallas Cowboys in the sixth round (73rd overall) of the 1964 NFL Draft and by the Oakland Raiders in the 12th round (95th overall) of the 1964 AFL Draft. He signed with the Cowboys to be a punter and placekicker.

As a rookie, even though he tore a ligament in his left knee in training camp, he was named the team's punter and third-team quarterback. His net punting average of 37.9 yards wasn't reached by another Cowboy until the 2006 season (Mat McBriar-38.6 yards). He also tied a franchise record with a 75-yard punt in the fifth game against the New York Giants.

On August 29, 1965, he was traded along with a fourth round draft choice  (#54-Rod Sherman) to the Baltimore Colts, in exchange for the rights to future All-Pro Ralph Neely.

Baltimore Colts
Lothridge was sold by the Baltimore Colts to the Los Angeles Rams before the start of the 1965 season.

Los Angeles Rams
After playing in 9 games he was waived on November 17, 1965.

Atlanta Falcons
On November 25, 1965, he signed with the Atlanta Falcons as one of the team's original players. He won the NFL punting title in 1967 with a 43.7 average and repeated the next year with a 42.8 average, while receiving All-Pro honors. In 1968, he was also a starter at safety and had 3 interceptions. He retired before the start of the 1971 season, but was brought back when the team experienced punting problems. He was waived before the start of the 1972 season.

Miami Dolphins
On November 22, 1972, he was signed by the Miami Dolphins to replace an injured Larry Seiple.  He punted for the Dolphins for 2 games, but was then placed on the team's taxi squad to make room to activate quarterback Bob Griese, even though Seiple was not quite ready to play (safety Dick Anderson had to serve as the team's punter for one game until Seiple returned). Although he was not active for the last 2 games of the season or for the playoffs, he got a chance to be a part of the Dolphins perfect season.

Personal life
Lothridge died in 1996, after suffering three heart attacks over a four-year period.

See also 

 List of Georgia Tech Yellow Jackets starting quarterbacks
 Georgia Tech Yellow Jackets football statistical leaders

References

External links
Bill Lothridge Georgia Hall of Fame bio
Lothridge seeks 3rd punting title

1942 births
1996 deaths
People from Gainesville, Georgia
People from Cleveland, Georgia
Sportspeople from the Atlanta metropolitan area
Players of American football from Georgia (U.S. state)
American football quarterbacks
American football punters
Georgia Tech Yellow Jackets football players
Dallas Cowboys players
Los Angeles Rams players
Atlanta Falcons players
Miami Dolphins players
Atlanta Falcons announcers
National Football League announcers